Gold Brook Covered Bridge, also known as Stowe Hollow Bridge or Emily's Bridge, is a small wooden covered bridge in the town of Stowe, Lamoille County, Vermont, carrying Covered Bridge Road over Gold Brook. Built in 1844, it is the only 19th-century covered bridge in the state built using wooden Howe trusses and carrying a public roadway.  It was added to the National Register of Historic Places in 1974.

Description and history
The Gold Brook Covered Bridge is located in the Stowe Hollow area of southeastern Stowe, carrying Covered Bridge Road across Gold Brook just north of a junction with Gold Brook Road and Stowe Hollow Road. It is covered by a gabled metal roof and rests on dry-laid stone abutments. The exterior is sheathed in vertical board siding, which extends most of the way to the eaves, leaving a narrow strip open at the top. The siding extends around the portals and a short way to their insides. The bridge decking is wooden planking.

The bridge was built about 1844 by John W. Smith, and is the state's only surviving example of a Howe truss in timber on a public roadway. It is also a comparatively early example of the truss type in general; the Howe truss was patented in 1840.  It is furthermore the only surviving 19th-century covered bridge in the town of Stowe.

In the media

Television
The Gold Brook Covered Bridge was featured as one of the haunted locations on the Paranormal TV series Most Terrifying Places in America episode titled "Cursed Towns", which aired on the Travel Channel in 2018. It told the legend of Emily, a teenage bride-to-be who was from a poor family. It is said by locals that in the 1850s, she fell in love with a young man from a rich family, but his parents refused the wedding. He told her to wait on the bridge for him at midnight, but when he didn't show up, she was so distraught, that she jumped off the bridge into the brook below and died. Locals report that her ghost is still lingering on the bridge that was nicknamed after her.

See also
National Register of Historic Places listings in Lamoille County, Vermont
List of Vermont covered bridges
List of bridges on the National Register of Historic Places in Vermont

References

External links

VPR Commentary on Emily's Bridge

Covered bridges on the National Register of Historic Places in Vermont
Bridges completed in 1844
Wooden bridges in Vermont
Covered bridges in Lamoille County, Vermont
Buildings and structures in Stowe, Vermont
National Register of Historic Places in Lamoille County, Vermont
Road bridges on the National Register of Historic Places in Vermont
Howe truss bridges in the United States